Emami Islamic Iranian Surname referring to twelver 'Imamah Shia Doctrine

Persons
Hassan Emami (1903–1981), Iranian Shia cleric and royalist politician
Jafar Sharif-Emami (1912–1998), Iranian politician
Karim Emami (1930–2005), Iranian translator
Mohammed Emami-Kashani (born 1931), Iranian ayatollah
Mohammad Reza Emami (17th century), Persian calligrapher
Saeed Emami (1958–1999), Iranian deputy minister of intelligence under Ali Fallahian
Younes Emami (born 1997), Iranian wrestler

Non-Iranians:
Ayiri Emami (born 1975), Nigerian businessman, billionaire

Others
Emami Limited, an Indian company